Pečenog is a village situated in Kraljevo municipality in Serbia.

References

Pečenog

Populated places in Raška District